Akin Osuntokun (born 24 November 1961) is a Nigerian political scientist, strategist, researcher, administrator, journalist and writer, with experience in media advocacy, policy research and implementation and political analysis. Akin Osuntokun was appointed as a Political Adviser to President Olusegun Obasanjo between 1999 and 2007. In 2011, Mr Akin Osuntokun became the Director of the Presidential Campaign of the People's Democratic Party in the 2011 general elections. On 27 December 2022, he was announced by the Nigerian Labor Party as the Director General of the Obi-Datti Presidential Campaign Council, to lead the 2023 presidential election campaign of a former governor of Anambra State, Mr Peter Obi after the resignation of Doyin Okupe 

Akin Osuntokun has served as the managing director of Odua Printing Corporation, News Agency of Nigeria, sat on the board of several public corporations and also contributes to newspaper columns. Akin Osuntokun is the current Balogun of Okemesi - which translates to the war commander of Okemesi Ekiti where he hails from. This title was once held by Fabunmi of Okemesi, who led the Kiriji War between 1877 and 1893. In July 2021, Balogun Akin Osuntokun was named by the Ooni of Ife, Adeyeye Enitan Ogunwusi as the chairman of the Ooni caucus alongside 27 other members some of which include the Olugbon of Igbon, Oba Olusola Alao; Senator Biodun Olujimi, Toyin Saraki, Segun Awolowo, Doyin Okupe, Otunba Gbenga Daniel, Prince Oye Oyewumi, Muyiwa Ige, General Olu Okunnowo, DIG Taiwo Lakanu (retd), General Secretary, Afenifere, Mr Sola Ebiseni; Jimi Agbaje, Sola Lawal, Debola Oluwagbayi, Dupe Adelaja, Dele Momodu, Senator Tolu Odebiyi, Dr Olusegun Mimiko, Dr Seun Obasanjo, Makin Soyinka, Dele Adesina (SAN), AIG Tunji Alapinni (retd.), Dr Reuben Abati, Eniola Bello, Bimbo Ashiru, Senator Tokunbo Ogunbanjo and Dapo Adelegan.

References

Living people
Nigerian political scientists
Date of birth missing (living people)
1961 births